The following outline is provided as an overview of and a topical guide to the history of the United States.

By period 
 Prehistory of the United States
 History of the United States
 Pre-Columbian era
 Colonial history of the United States
 1776–1789
 1789–1849
 1849–1865
 1865–1918
 1918–1945
 1945–1964
 1964–1980
 1980–1991
 1991–2008
 2008–present

Named eras and periods 
These multi-year periods are commonly identified in American history. The existence and dating of some of these periods is debated by historians.

 Plantation era (c. 1700–c. 1860)
 First Great Awakening (1730s–1740s)
 American Revolution (1775–1783)
 Second Great Awakening (c. 1800–c. 1840)
 First-wave feminism (19th century–early 20th century)
 Manifest Destiny (c. 1812–c. 1860)
 Era of Good Feelings (c. 1817–c. 1825)
Jacksonian Era (c. 1820–c. 1845)
 The Slave Power (c. 1840–c. 1875)
 California Gold Rush (1848–1855)
 American Civil War (1861–1865)
 Reconstruction era (c. 1865–1877)
 Gilded Age (1869–c. 1896)
 Jim Crow era (1876–1965)
 Gay Nineties (1890s) 
 Nadir of American race relations (c. 1890–1940)
 Progressive Era (1890s–1920s)
 Lochner era (c. 1897–c. 1937)
 American Century (20th century)
 Great Migration (c. 1910–c. 1940)
 World War I (c. 1914-c.1918)
 First Red Scare (1917–1920)
 Prohibition in the United States (1919–1933)
 Roaring Twenties (1920s)
 Jazz Age (1920s)
 Great Depression (1929–1939)
 Dust Bowl (1930–1936)
 New Deal era (1933–1938)
 World War II (1939-1945)
 Second Great Migration (c. 1941–c. 1970)
 Cold War (1947–1991)
 Second Red Scare (1947–1957)
 Civil rights era (1954–1968)
 Space Race (1957–1975)
 Second-wave feminism (1960s–1970s)
 New Great Migration (1965–present)
 Détente (c. 1969–1979)
 1970s energy crisis (1973–1980)
 Reagan Era (1980–1994)
 Neoconservatism (1980s and 90s)
 Dot-com bubble (c. 1995–2000)
 United States housing bubble (c. 2001–c. 2005)
 War on Terror (2001–present)

Political parties
These periods are commonly identified as the large changes within political parties. Newer Party Systems are typically disputed by experts and historians due to the complexity of changes in political parties.
 First Party System (c. 1788–c. 1824)
 Second Party System (c. 1828–c. 1854)
 Third Party System (c. 1854–c. 1894)
 Fourth Party System (c. 1896–c. 1930)
 Fifth Party System (c. 1932–c. 1976)
 Sixth Party System (c. 1980–present)

Wars
See List of wars involving the United States.

Timelines and lists 
 Timeline of pre–United States history
 Timeline of United States history (1790–1819)
 Timeline of United States history (1820–1859)
 Timeline of United States history (1860–1899)
 Timeline of United States history (1900–1929)
 Timeline of United States history (1930–1949)
 Timeline of United States history (1950–1969)
 Timeline of United States history (1970–1989)
 Timeline of United States history (1990–2009)
 Timeline of United States history (2010–present)
 Years in the United States

15th century

1490s 
 On October 12, 1492, three Spanish ships under the command of Cristoforo Colombo (Christopher Columbus) landed on the Lucayan island of Guanahani which he names San Salvador (The Savior).
 On November 14, 1493, a Spanish fleet under the command of Columbus lands on a large inhabited island which he names Santa Cruz (Holy Cross, now Saint Croix). Columbus then visits and names San Tomas (Saint Thomas) and San Juan (Saint John). Columbus names the archipelago Santa Ursula y las Once Mil Vírgenes (Saint Ursula and her 11,000 virgins, now the Virgin Islands).
 On November 19, 1493, Columbus lands on the large Taíno island of Borikén which he names San Juan Bautista (Saint John the Baptist, now Puerto Rico and part of the United States).

16th century

1500s 
 On August 8, 1508, Spanish conquistador Juan Ponce de León establishes Capárra, the first European settlement on the island of San Juan Bautista in Puerto Rico.

1510s 
 On Easter Sunday, April 2, 1513, a Spanish expedition led by Juan Ponce de León lands on a huge inhabited island (later determined to be a continental peninsula) which he names La Pascua Florida (the Feast of Flowers, now Florida).

1520s 
 On March 6, 1521, three Spanish ships under the command of Fernão de Magalhães (Ferdinand Magellan) land on the Island of Guam after a seemingly endless eleven week voyage across the Pacific Ocean. Magellan names the archipelago Las Isles de las Velas Latinas (The Islands of the Latine Sails). When the Spaniards refuse to pay for supplies, natives take iron from the ships. Magellan renames the archipelago Las Islas de los Ladrones (The Islands of the Thieves).

1540s 
 A Spanish expedition led by Juan Rodríguez Cabrillo lands at a bay of the Pacific Ocean which he names San Miguel (Saint Michael, now San Diego, California) on September 28, 1542.

1550s 
 A Spanish expedition led by Tristán de Luna y Arellano establishes a colony at Santa Maria de Ochuse (Pensacola, Florida) on August 15, 1559.
 A hurricane destroys most of the Ochuse colony five weeks later on September 19, 1559.

1560s 
 Jean Ribault explores the Atlantic coast of Florida for France in 1562.
 French Huguenots led by René Goulaine de Laudonnière establish Fort de la Caroline on June 22, 1564
 Spanish Governor Pedro Menéndez de Avilés establishes a colony about 10 leagues (56 kilometers or 35 miles) farther south at San Agustín (St. Augustine, Florida) on September 8, 1565
 Spanish Governor Pedro Menéndez de Avilés captures Fort de la Caroline on September 20, 1565
 Governor Menéndez orders the execution of 140 Huguenots from Fort de la Caroline and orders fort rebuilt as Fuerte San Mateo on September 29, 1565
 Governor Menéndez orders the execution of Jean Ribault and 350 shipwrecked Huguenots on October 12, 1565
 French raiders led by Dominique de Gourgues destroy Fuerte San Mateo and murder all its defenders on April 27–28, 1567

1570s 
 Spanish Jesuit priests establish Mission Santa Maria on Ajacán (the Virginia Peninsula) on September 10, 1570 – 1572

1580s 
 Spain, Portugal, Italy, and the Polish–Lithuanian Commonwealth adopt the new Gregorian calendar on October 15, 1582 (New Style)
 English establish Roanoke Colony on Roanoke Island in Virginia (now North Carolina) in July 1585

1590s 
 On August 18, 1590, a resupply party finds the Roanoke Colony dismantled and deserted. The fate of the settlers remains a mystery.
 Spanish Governor Juan de Oñate Salazar founds the colony of Santa Fé de Nuevo Méjico (New Mexico) at San Juan de los Caballeros on July 11, 1598

17th century

1600s 
 French establish the colony of l'Acadie (Acadia) on Île Sainte-Croix (Saint Croix Island, Maine), June 1604 – 1605
 English establish the Virginia Colony on Jamestown Island on May 14, 1607
 English establish the Popham Colony along the Kennebec River (Maine) on August 13, 1607 – August 1607
 First Anglo-Powhatan War, 1609–1613

1610s 
 Spanish Governor Pedro de Peralta moves the capital of Santa Fé de Nuevo Méjico (New Mexico) from San Juan de los Caballeros to La Villa Real de la Santa Fé de San Francisco de Asís (Santa Fe) in 1610
 The first slave ship arrives in Jamestown, Virginia in 1619

1620s 
 English Puritans establish the Plymouth Colony on November 11, 1620
 Netherlands establish the province of Nieuw-Nederland (New Netherland) along the Hudson River in May 1624
 English Puritans establish the Newe-England Colony on September 6, 1628
 King Charles I of England grants the Newe-England Colony a royal charter as the Governour and Company of the Mattachusetts Bay in Newe-England on March 4, 1629

1630s 
 The Town of Boston is chartered and named capital of the Massachusetts Bay Colony, September 7, 1630
 English Puritans establish the Saybrook Colony along the Connecticut River, 1635
 English Puritans establish the River Colony along the Connecticut River, March 3, 1636
 Roger Williams establishes the Colony of Providence, June 1636
 Pequot War, July 20, 1636 – May 26, 1637
 Swedish establish the colony of Nya Sverige (New Sweden) along the Delaware River, March 29, 1638
 English establish the Newe-Haven Colony, April 14, 1638
 Anne Hutchinson establishes the first of the colonies of Rhode Island, 1638

1640s 
 King Charles II grants a charter for the Colony of Providence Plantations including the Colony of Providence and the colonies of Rhode Island, March 1644
 Second Anglo-Powhatan War, 1644–1646
 The Connecticut Colony annexes the Saybrook Colony, 1644

1660s 
 King Charles II of England grants the River Colony a royal charter as the Colony of Connecticut, May 1662
 King Charles II of England grants a royal charter for the Colony of Rhode Island and Providence Plantations, 1663
 England seizes New Netherland from the Netherlands, August 27, 1664. England splits New Netherland into the Province of New-York and the Province of New-Jersey.
 The Colony of Connecticut annexes the New-Haven Colony, January 5, 1665
 Second Anglo-Dutch War, March 4, 1665 – July 31, 1667

1670s 
 Third Anglo-Dutch War, April 7, 1672 – March 5, 1674
 A Netherlands fleet under the command of Cornelis Evertsen de Jongste captures the Province of New-York, August 1673.
 Netherlands military government of New Netherland, August 1673 – March 5, 1674
 Treaty of Westminster, February 19, 1674
 England regains control of the Province of New-York, March 5, 1674
 The Province of New-Jersey is split into the Province of East Jersey and the Province of West Jersey, March 18, 1673
 King Philip's War, June 8, 1675 – August 12, 1676

1680s 
 Pueblo Revolt in Santa Fé de Nuevo Méjico, August 10, 1680 – September 14, 1692
 Popé leads revolt of Puebloan peoples against Spanish rule, European culture, and Christian religion, August 10, 1680
 Spanish settlers flee Santa Fé for El Paso del Norte, August 21, 1680
 New Spanish Governor Diego de Vargas Zapata y Luján Ponce de León y Contreras reconquers Santa Fé de Nuevo Méjico, September 14, 1692
 King Charles II of England grants William Penn a charter for the Province of Pennsylvania, March 4, 1681
 William Penn leases the three lower counties on the Delaware River (Delaware) from James, Duke of York, March 1682
 William Penn writes the first Frame of Government of Pennsylvania (including the three lower counties on the Delaware River), April 2, 1682
 Dominion of New-England in America, June 3, 1686 – May 18, 1689
 England creates the Dominion of New-England in America to rule the Colony of Massachusetts Bay, the Colony of New-Plymouth, the Province of New-Hampshire, the Province of Main, and the Narraganset Country or King's Province, June 3, 1686
 England adds the Colony of Rhode Island and Providence Plantations and the Connecticut Colony to the Dominion of New England in America, September 9, 1686
 England adds the Province of New-York, the Province of East Jersey, and the Province of West Jersey to the Dominion of New-England in America, May 7, 1688
 The government of the Dominion of New-England in America collapses, May 18, 1689. The Colony of Massachusetts Bay, the Colony of New-Plymouth, the Province of New-Hampshire, the Province of Main, the Narraganset Country or King's Province as the Dominion of New-England in America, the Colony of Rhode Island and Providence Plantations, the Connecticut Colony the Province of New-York, the Province of East Jersey, and the Province of West Jersey resume their previous self-governance.
 King William's War, 1689 – September 20, 1697
 Treaty of Ryswick, September 20, 1697

1690s 
 English diarchs William III and Mary II organize the Province of Massachusetts Bay as a crown colony including the Massachusetts Bay Colony, the New-Plymouth Colony, Martha's Vineyard, Nantucket Island, the Province of Maine, and the English claims in Nova Scotia, October 7, 1691
 Governor Francis Nicholson moves the capital of the Province of Maryland from Saint Mary's City to Anne Arundel's Towne which he renames Annapolis, 1694

18th century

1700s 

 England reunites the Province of East Jersey and the Province of West Jersey as the Province of New-Jersey
 Queen Anne's War, 1702 – April 11, 1713
 Treaty of Utrecht, April 11, 1713
 William Penn grants the three lower counties on the Delaware River their own General Assembly, making Delaware a semi-autonomous region of the Province of Pennsylvania, November 1704 – July 4, 1776
 The Kingdom of England and the Kingdom of Scotland unite to become the Kingdom of Great Britain on May 1, 1707. England's colonies become British colonies.

1710s 
 Tuscarora War, 1711 – February 11, 1715
 France cedes l'Acadie to England with the Treaty of Utrecht, April 11, 1713
 Yamasee War, 1715–1717

1720s 
 Dummer's War, 1721–1725

1730s 
 King George II of Great Britain grants James Oglethorpe a charter for the Province of Georgia, April 21, 1732
 War of Jenkins' Ear, 1739–1748

1740s 
 King George's War, 1740 – October 18, 1748
 Treaty of Aix-la-Chapelle, October 18, 1748

1750s 
 Spain establishes El Presidio Reál San Ignacio de Tubac in Sonora y Sinaloa (now Arizona), June 2, 1752
 The Kingdom of Great Britain and the British Empire adopt the Gregorian calendar, September 14, 1752
 French and Indian War, May 28, 1754 – February 10, 1763
 Britain orders all French Acadians to leave Nova Scotia in Le Grand Dérangement, August 11, 1755
 Treaty of Paris, February 10, 1763

1760s 

 Pontiac's Rebellion, 1763–1767
 Royal Proclamation of 1763, October 7, 1763
 British Indian Reserve, October 7, 1763 – September 3, 1783
 War of the Regulation, 1764–1771
 Spain establishes El Presidio Reál de San Diego in California, May 14, 1769

1770s 
 British troops kill five civilians in Boston on March 5, 1770
 Spain establishes colony of Las Californias, June 3, 1770 – March 26, 1804
 Spain establishes El Presidio Reál de San Carlos de Monterey on June 3, 1770
 Dunmore's War, 1773–1774
 The Parliament of Great Britain passes the Massachusetts Government Act on May 20, 1774
 The Massachusetts Provincial Congress is organized on October 7, 1774, in response to the Massachusetts Government Act
 American Revolutionary War, April 19, 1775 – September 3, 1783
 Battles of Lexington and Concord on April 19, 1775
 The Province of New Hampshire adopts a constitution for an independent State of New Hampshire, January 5, 1776
 The Province of South Carolina adopts a constitution for an independent State of South Carolina on March 15, 1776
 The Colony of Rhode Island and Providence Plantations declares its independence from the Kingdom of Great Britain on May 4, 1776
 The Colony of Connecticut declares its independence from the Kingdom of Great Britain on June 18, 1776
 The Colony of Virginia adopts a constitution for an independent Commonwealth of Virginia on June 29, 1776
 The Province of New Jersey adopts a constitution for an independent State of New Jersey on July 2, 1776
 The 13 British North American provinces of Virginia, Massachusetts Bay, Maryland, Connecticut, Rhode Island and Providence Plantations, New York, New Jersey, New Hampshire, Pennsylvania and Delaware, South Carolina, North Carolina, and Georgia united as the United States of America declare their independence from the Kingdom of Great Britain on July 4, 1776
 The Republic of New Connecticut declares its independence from the Kingdom of Great Britain on January 15, 1777
 The Republic of New Connecticut changes its name to Vermont on June 2, 1777
 Battles of Saratoga on September 19 and October 7, 1777
 Battle of the Chesapeake on September 5, 1781
 Siege of Yorktown, September 28 – October 19, 1781
 Treaty of Paris signed on September 3, 1783
 Spain establishes El Presidio Reál de San Francisco de Asis in Las Californias, September 17, 1776
 English explorer James Cook becomes the first European to visit the Hawaiian Islands which he names the Sandwich Islands, January 18, 1778

1780s 
 The Constitution of the Commonwealth of Massachusetts takes effect on October 25, 1780, changing the name of the State of Massachusetts Bay.
 Spain establishes El Presidio Reál de Santa Barbara in Las Californias, April 21, 1782
 Northwest Indian War, 1785 – August 3, 1795
 Treaty of Greenville, August 3, 1795
 Shays' Rebellion, August 29, 1786 – May 25, 1787
 The Philadelphia Convention writes a new Constitution of the United States, May 25, 1787 – September 17, 1787
 The Congress of the Confederation organizes the Territory Northwest of the River Ohio, July 13, 1787
 The State of Delaware becomes the 1st state to ratify the US Constitution on December 7, 1787
 The Commonwealth of Pennsylvania becomes the 2nd state to ratify the US Constitution on December 12, 1787
 The State of New Jersey becomes the 3rd state to ratify the US Constitution on December 18, 1787
 The State of Georgia becomes the 4th state to ratify the US Constitution on January 2, 1788
 The State of Connecticut becomes the 5th state to ratify the US Constitution on January 9, 1788
 The Commonwealth of Massachusetts becomes the 6th state to ratify the US Constitution on February 6, 1788
 The State of Maryland becomes the 7th state to ratify the US Constitution on April 28, 1788
 The State of South Carolina becomes the 8th state to ratify the US Constitution on May 23, 1788
 The US Constitution takes effect when the State of New Hampshire becomes the 9th state to ratify the document on June 21, 1788
 The Commonwealth of Virginia becomes the 10th state to ratify the US Constitution on June 25, 1788
 The State of New York becomes the 11th state to ratify the US Constitution on July 26, 1788
 A new government under the US Constitution comes into being on March 4, 1789
 George Washington becomes the 1st President of the United States on April 30, 1789
 The State of North Carolina becomes the 12th state to ratify the US Constitution on November 21, 1789

1790s 
 The State of Rhode Island and Providence Plantations becomes the 13th state to ratify the US Constitution on May 29, 1790
 The Vermont Republic is admitted to the Union as the State of Vermont (the 14th state) on March 4, 1791
 Whiskey Rebellion, 1791–1794
 The United States Bill of Rights, the first ten amendments to the US Constitution, takes effect on December 15, 1791
 The United States sells the Erie Triangle to the Commonwealth of Pennsylvania, March 3, 1792
 The District of Kentucky of the Commonwealth of Virginia is admitted to the Union as the Commonwealth of Kentucky (the 15th state) on June 1, 1792
 The Eleventh Amendment to the United States Constitution takes effect, February 7, 1795
 The Territory South of the River Ohio is admitted to the Union as the State of Tennessee (the 16th state) on June 1, 1796
 John Adams becomes the 2nd President of the United States on March 4, 1797
 The Territory of Mississippi is organized, April 7, 1798
 Quasi-War, 1798–1800

19th century

1800s 
 The Territory of Indiana is organized, May 7, 1800
 Thomas Jefferson becomes the 3rd President of the United States on March 4, 1801
 First Barbary War, 1801–1805
 The Territory Northwest of the River Ohio is admitted to the Union as the State of Ohio (the 17th state) on March 1, 1803
 The United States takes possession of the Louisiana Purchase, December 20, 1803
 Spanish creates the colony of Alta California from northern portion of Las Californias, March 26, 1804 – August 24, 1821
 Lewis and Clark Expedition, May 14, 1804 – September 23, 1806
 Lewis and Clark Expedition reaches the Pacific Ocean, November 18, 1805
 The Twelfth Amendment to the United States Constitution takes effect, June 15, 1804
 Battle of Sitka, October 1804
 The Territory of Orleans is organized and the District of Louisiana is created, October 1, 1804
 The Territory of Michigan is organized, June 30, 1805
 The Territory of Louisiana is organized, July 4, 1805
 Pike Expedition, July 15, 1806 – July 1, 1807
 Spanish cavalry arrests Pike Expedition, February 26, 1807
 The Territory of Illinois is organized, March 1, 1809
 James Madison becomes the 4th President of the United States on March 4, 1809

1810s 
 Mexican War of Independence, September 16, 1810 – August 24, 1821
 Grito de Dolores on September 16, 1810
 Treaty of Córdoba signed on August 24, 1821
 The Republic of West Florida declares its independence from Spain, September 23, 1810
 The United States unilaterally annexes the Florida Parishes of Spanish Florida Occidental, October 27, 1810
 Tecumseh's War, 1811
 A tremendous earthquake strikes the region around New Madrid in the Territory of Louisiana (Missouri), February 7, 1812
 The Territory of Orleans is admitted to the Union as the State of Louisiana (the 18th state) on April 30, 1812
 The Territory of Louisiana is renamed the Territory of Missouri on June 4, 1812
 War of 1812, June 18, 1812 – March 23, 1815
 The United States declares war on the United Kingdom of Great Britain and Ireland on June 18, 1812
 Battle of Lake Erie on September 10, 1813
 Battle of Bladensburg on August 24, 1814
 Burning of Washington on August 24, 1814
 Battle of Plattsburgh, September 6, 1814 – September 11, 1814
 Battle of Baltimore, September 12, 1814 – September 15, 1814
 Treaty of Ghent signed on December 24, 1814
 Battle of New Orleans on January 8, 1815
 Creek War, 1813–1814
 First Seminole War, 1814–1819
 Second Barbary War, March 3, 1815 – December 23, 1816
 The United States declares war on Algiers, March 3, 1815
 The Territory of Indiana is admitted to the Union as the State of Indiana (the 19th state) on December 11, 1816
 The Territory of Alabama is organized, March 3, 1817
 James Monroe becomes the 5th President of the United States on March 4, 1817
 The Territory of Mississippi is admitted to the Union as the State of Mississippi (the 20th state) on December 10, 1817
 The Territory of Illinois is admitted to the Union as the State of Illinois (the 21st state) on December 3, 1818.
 The Territory of Arkansaw is organized, July 4, 1819
 The Territory of Alabama is admitted to the Union as the State of Alabama (the 22nd state) on December 14, 1819

1820s 
 The District of Maine of the Commonwealth of Massachusetts is admitted to the Union as the State of Maine (the 23rd state) on March 15, 1820
 The Adams-Onis Treaty establishes the boundary between the United States and the Kingdom of Spain, February 22, 1821
 The southeastern portion of the Territory of Missouri is admitted to the Union as the State of Missouri (the 24th state) on August 10, 1821. The remainder of the Missouri Territory becomes unorganized.
 The Territory of Florida is organized, March 30, 1822
 The Russo-American Treaty establishes the boundary between Russian Alaska and the Oregon Country at the parallel 54°40′ north, January 12, 1825
 John Quincy Adams becomes the 6th President of the United States on March 4, 1825
 Winnebago War, 1827
 Andrew Jackson becomes the 7th President of the United States on March 4, 1829

1830s 
 Nat Turner's slave rebellion, August 21, 1831 – August 22, 1831
 Black Hawk War, 1832
 Second Seminole War, 1835–1842
 Toledo War, 1835–1836
 Texas Revolution, October 2, 1835 – October 2, 1836
 Battle of the Alamo, February 23, 1836 – March 6, 1836
 Texas Declaration of Independence, March 2, 1836
 Battle of San Jacinto, April 21, 1836
 Texas-Indian Wars, May 19, 1836 – June 2, 1875
 Fort Parker massacre, May 19, 1836
 Council House massacre, March 19, 1840
 The Territory of Arkansaw is admitted to the Union as the State of Arkansas (the 25th state) on June 15, 1836
 The Territory of Wisconsin is organized, July 3, 1836
 The United States buys the Platte Purchase from the recently relocated Iowa, Sac, and Fox nations, September 17, 1836. The purchase includes the region east of the Missouri River, south of Sullivan Line, and west of the mouth of the Kaw (Kansas) River.
 The Territory of Michigan is admitted to the Union as the State of Michigan (the 26th state) on January 26, 1837
 Martin Van Buren becomes the 8th President of the United States on March 4, 1837
 The Platte Purchase is annexed to the State of Missouri, March 28, 1837
 Missouri Mormon War, August 6, 1838 – November 1, 1838
 The Territory of Iowa is organized, July 4, 1838
 Aroostook War, 1838–1839
 Honey War, 1839

1840s 
 William Henry Harrison becomes the 9th President of the United States on March 4, 1841
 John Tyler becomes the 10th President of the United States upon the death of President William Henry Harrison on April 4, 1841
 The extralegal Provisional Government of Oregon governs the Oregon Country, May 2, 1843 – August 14, 1848
 Illinois Mormon War, June 7, 1844 – September 17, 1846
 Assassination of Joseph Smith, Jr. on June 27, 1844
 Battle of Nauvoo, September 12, 1846 – September 17, 1846
 Treaty of Wanghia, July 3, 1844
 The Territory of Florida is admitted to the Union as the State of Florida (the 27th state) on March 3, 1845
 James K. Polk becomes the 11th President of the United States on March 4, 1845
 The Republic of Texas is admitted to the Union as the State of Texas (the 28th state) on December 29, 1845
 Mexican–American War, April 23, 1846 – February 2, 1848
 The United States declares war on Mexico, May 11, 1846
 Treaty of Guadalupe Hidalgo signed on February 2, 1848
 Biddle Expedition arrives at Uraga Harbor in Japan, July 20, 1846
 The southeastern portion of the Territory of Iowa is admitted to the Union as the State of Iowa (the 29th state) on December 28, 1846. The remainder of the Iowa Territory becomes unorganized.
 Cayuse War, November 29, 1847 – June 11, 1855
 Walla Walla Treaty, June 11, 1855
 The southeastern portion of the Territory of Wisconsin is admitted to the Union as the State of Wisconsin (the 30th state) on May 29, 1848. The remainder of the Wisconsin Territory becomes unorganized.
 The Territory of Oregon is organized, August 14, 1848
 The Territory of Minnesota is organized, March 3, 1849
 The extralegal State of Deseret governs the Great Basin region, May 3, 1849 – September 9, 1850
 Zachary Taylor becomes the 12th President of the United States on March 4, 1849

1850s 
 Millard Fillmore becomes the 13th President of the United States upon the death of President Zachary Taylor on July 9, 1850
 The State of California is admitted to the Union as the 31st state on September 9, 1850
 The Territory of New Mexico and the Territory of Utah are organized, September 9, 1850
 The Territory of Washington is organized, February 8, 1853
 Franklin Pierce becomes the 14th President of the United States on March 4, 1853
 Perry Expedition arrives at Uraga Harbor in Japan, July 14, 1853
 Convention of Kanagawa, March 31, 1854
 The Territory of Kansas and the Territory of Nebraska are organized, May 20, 1854
 Sioux Wars, August 19, 1854 – December 29, 1890
 Grattan massacre, August 19, 1854
 Wounded Knee Massacre, December 29, 1890
 James Buchanan becomes the 15th President of the United States on March 4, 1857
 Utah Mormon War, May 28, 1857 – July 8, 1858
 Mountain Meadows massacre, September 11, 1857
 The eastern portion of the Territory of Minnesota is admitted to the Union as the State of Minnesota (the 32nd state) on May 11, 1858. The remainder of the Minnesota Territory becomes unorganized.
 The extralegal Territory of Jefferson governs the Southern Rocky Mountains region, October 24, 1859 – February 28, 1861
 The western portion of the Oregon Territory is admitted to the Union as the State of Oregon (the 33rd state) on February 14, 1859. The remainder of the Oregon Territory is annexed to the Washington Territory.

1860s 
 The State of South Carolina becomes the 1st state to secede from the Union on December 20, 1860
 The State of Mississippi becomes the 2nd state to secede from the Union on January 9, 1861
 The State of Florida becomes the 3rd state to secede from the Union on January 10, 1861
 The State of Alabama becomes the 4th state to secede from the Union on January 11, 1861
 The State of Georgia becomes the 5th state to secede from the Union on January 19, 1861
 The State of Louisiana becomes the 6th state to secede from the Union on January 26, 1861
 The eastern portion of the Territory of Kansas is admitted to the Union as the State of Kansas (the 34th state) on January 29, 1861. The remainder of the Kansas territory becomes unorganized.
 The State of Texas becomes the 7th state to secede from the Union on February 1, 1861
 The 7 rebellious slave states of South Carolina, Mississippi, Florida, Alabama, Georgia, Louisiana, and Texas create the rival Confederate States of America on February 4, 1861
 The Territory of Colorado is organized, February 28, 1861
 The Territory of Nevada is organized, March 2, 1861
 The Territory of Dakota is organized, March 2, 1861
 Abraham Lincoln becomes the 16th President of the United States on March 4, 1861
 A rump government declares itself the Confederate Territory of Arizona on March 16, 1861
 American Civil War, April 12, 1861 – May 13, 1865
 Battle of Fort Sumter, April 12, 1861 – April 13, 1861
 The Commonwealth of Virginia becomes the 8th state to secede from the Union on April 17, 1861
 Union naval blockade of the Confederacy, April 19, 1861 – April 9, 1865
 The State of Arkansas becomes the 9th state to secede from the Union on May 6, 1861
 The Commonwealth of Virginia becomes the 8th state admitted to the Confederacy on May 7, 1861
 The State of North Carolina becomes the 10th state to secede from the Union on May 20, 1861
 The State of Arkansas becomes the 9th state admitted to the Confederacy on May 18, 1861
 The State of North Carolina becomes the 10th state admitted to the Confederacy on May 21, 1861
 The State of Tennessee becomes the 11th state to secede from the Union on June 8, 1861
 The State of Tennessee becomes the 11th state admitted to the Confederacy on July 2, 1861
 First Battle of Bull Run, July 21, 1861
 A rump government claiming to represent the State of Missouri declares its secession from the Union on October 31, 1861
 A rump government claiming to represent the Commonwealth of Kentucky declares its secession from the Union on November 20, 1861
 The rump government of the State of Missouri becomes the 12th state admitted to the Confederacy on November 28, 1861
 The rump government of the Commonwealth of Kentucky becomes the 13th state admitted to the Confederacy on December 10, 1861
 The rump government of the Confederate Territory of Arizona becomes the only Confederate Territory on February 14, 1862
 Battle of Shiloh, April 6, 1862 – April 7, 1862
 Battle of Antietam, September 17, 1862
 The Territory of Arizona is organized, February 24, 1863
 The Territory of Idaho is organized, March 4, 1863
 Siege of Vicksburg, May 18, 1863 – July 4, 1863
 The northwestern region of the Commonwealth of Virginia is admitted to the Union as the State of West Virginia (the 35th state) on June 20, 1863
 Battle of Gettysburg, July 1, 1863 – July 3, 1863
 President Lincoln issues the Emancipation Proclamation on September 22, 1863
 Siege of Atlanta, May 7, 1864 – September 2, 1864
 The Territory of Montana is organized, May 28, 1864
 The State of Nevada is admitted to the Union as the 36th state on October 31, 1864
 Battle of Appomattox Courthouse, April 9, 1865
 Assassination of President Abraham Lincoln in Washington, D.C. on April 14, 1865
 President Abraham Lincoln dies on April 15, 1865
 Andrew Johnson becomes 17th President of the United States on April 15, 1865
 The Thirteenth Amendment to the United States Constitution takes effect, December 18, 1865
 The State of Tennessee becomes the 1st Confederate State readmitted to the Union on July 24, 1866
 The Territory of Nebraska is admitted to the Union as the State of Nebraska (the 37th state) on March 1, 1867
 President Andrew Johnson is impeached by the United States House of Representatives, February 24, 1868
 President Andrew Johnson is acquitted by the United States Senate, May 16, 1868
 The State of Arkansas becomes the 2nd Confederate State readmitted to the Union on June 22, 1868
 The State of Florida becomes the 3rd Confederate State readmitted to the Union on June 25, 1868
 The State of North Carolina becomes the 4th Confederate State readmitted to the Union on July 4, 1868
 The Fourteenth Amendment to the United States Constitution takes effect, July 9, 1868
 The State of Louisiana becomes the 5th Confederate State readmitted to the Union on July 9, 1868
 The State of South Carolina becomes the 6th Confederate State readmitted to the Union on July 9, 1868
 The State of Alabama becomes the 7th Confederate State readmitted to the Union on July 13, 1868
 The Territory of Wyoming is organized, July 25, 1868
 Ulysses S. Grant becomes the 18th President of the United States on March 4, 1869
 The Transcontinental railroad is completed on May 10, 1869

1870s 
 The Commonwealth of Virginia becomes the 8th Confederate State readmitted to the Union on January 26, 1870
 The Fifteenth Amendment to the United States Constitution, February 3, 1870
 The State of Mississippi becomes the 9th Confederate State readmitted to the Union on February 23, 1870
 The State of Texas becomes the 10th Confederate State readmitted to the Union on March 30, 1870
 The State of Georgia becomes the 11th and last Confederate State readmitted to the Union on July 15, 1870
 The United States attacks Korea, June 10, 1871 – July 3, 1871
 Black Hills War, March 17, 1876 – 1877
 Battle of the Little Bighorn, June 25, 1876 – June 26, 1876
 The nation celebrates the Centennial of the United States of America despite news from the Little Bighorn, July 4, 1876
 The Territory of Colorado is admitted to the Union as the State of Colorado (the 38th state) on August 1, 1876
 Rutherford B. Hayes becomes the 19th President of the United States on March 4, 1877

1880s 
 James A. Garfield becomes the 20th President of the United States on March 4, 1881
 Chester A. Arthur becomes the 21st President of the United States upon the assassination of President James Garfield on September 19, 1881
 The portion of the Dakota Territory south of the 42nd parallel north and west of the Missouri River is annexed to the State of Nebraska, March 28, 1882
 Grover Cleveland becomes the 22nd President of the United States on March 4, 1885
 Benjamin Harrison becomes the 23rd President of the United States on March 4, 1889
 The Territory of Dakota is admitted to the Union as the State of North Dakota and the State of South Dakota (the 39th state and the 40th state) on November 2, 1889
 The Territory of Montana is admitted to the Union as the State of Montana (the 41st state) on November 8, 1889
 The Territory of Washington is admitted to the Union as the State of Washington (the 42nd state) on November 11, 1889

1890s 
 The Territory of Oklahoma is organized, May 2, 1890
 The Territory of Idaho is admitted to the Union as the State of Idaho (the 43rd state) on July 3, 1890
 The Territory of Wyoming is admitted to the Union as the State of Wyoming (the 44th state) on July 10, 1890
 Grover Cleveland becomes the 24th (as well as the 22nd) President of the United States on March 4, 1893
 The Territory of Utah is admitted to the Union as the State of Utah (the 45th state) on January 4, 1896
 William McKinley becomes the 25th President of the United States on March 4, 1897
 Spanish–American War, April 23 – August 12, 1898
 Teller Amendment blocks United States annexation of Cuba, April 20, 1898
 The Spanish Empire declares war on the United States, April 23, 1898
 Invasion of Guantánamo Bay, June 6, 1898 – June 10, 1898
 Capture of Guam, June 20, 1898 – June 21, 1898
 Battle of Santiago de Cuba, July 3, 1898
 Invasion of Puerto Rico, July 25, 1898 – August 13, 1898
 Protocol of Peace signed on August 12, 1898
 Treaty of Paris, December 10, 1898
 The United States annexes the Philippines, Porto Rico (sic), and Guam, December 10, 1898
 The United States formally occupies Cuba, January 1, 1899 – May 20, 1902
 Platt Amendment promotes United States hegemony of Cuba, March 2, 1901
 The Territory of Hawaii is organized, July 7, 1898
 Second Samoan Civil War, August 22, 1898 – November 14, 1899
 Anglo-German Samoa Convention, November 14, 1899
 The United States annexes Eastern Samoa, December 2, 1899
 Philippine–American War, June 2, 1899 – June 15, 1913
 Philippine Declaration of Independence, June 12, 1898
 The Philippines declares war on the United States, June 2, 1899
 Moro Rebellion, May 2, 1902 – June 15, 1913
 Organic Act for the Philippine Islands, July 1, 1902
 President Theodore Roosevelt declares the end of Philippine–American War, July 4, 1902
 Boxer Rebellion, November 2, 1899 – September 7, 1901
 The Society of Right and Harmonious Fists attacks Beijing, June 20, 1900
 The Eight-Nation Alliance relieves Beijing, August 14, 1900
 The Boxer Protocol is imposed on China, September 7, 1901

20th century

1900s 
 A hurricane strikes Galveston, Texas, killing approximately 8,000 people, September 8, 1900
 Theodore Roosevelt becomes the 26th President of the United States upon the assassination of President William McKinley on September 14, 1901
 The United States recognizes the independence of the Republic of Cuba, May 20, 1902
 The United States formally ends its occupation of Cuba, May 20, 1902
 The United States seizes opportunity to build a ship canal across the Isthmus of Panama, January 22, 1903 – August 15, 1914
 The United States and the Republic of Colombia sign the Hay–Herrán Treaty, January 22, 1903
 The Congress of Colombia rejects the Hay–Herrán Treaty, August 12, 1903
 The United States Navy patrol gunboat USS Nashville blocks Colombian attempts to suppress a Panamanian separatist movement, October 26, 1903 – March 4, 1904
 The Republic of Panama declares its independence from the Republic of Colombia, November 3, 1903
 United States Marines occupy region around proposed canal, November 4, 1903 – January 21, 1914
 The United States and the Republic of Panama sign the Hay–Bunau-Varilla Treaty, November 18, 1903
 The United States annexes the Panama Canal Zone, November 18, 1903
 A tremendous earthquake strikes the San Francisco region, April 18, 1906
 The United States reoccupies Cuba, September 29, 1906 – January 28, 1909
 The Territory of Oklahoma is admitted to the Union as the State of Oklahoma (the 46th state) on November 16, 1907
 William Howard Taft becomes the 27th President of the United States on March 4, 1909

1910s 
 The Territory of New Mexico is admitted to the Union as the State of New Mexico (the 47th state) on January 6, 1912
 The Territory of Arizona is admitted to the Union as the State of Arizona (the 48th state) on February 14, 1912
 The District of Alaska is reorganized as the Territory of Alaska, August 24, 1912
 The Sixteenth Amendment to the United States Constitution takes effect, February 3, 1913
 Woodrow Wilson becomes the 28th President of the United States on March 4, 1913
 The Seventeenth Amendment to the United States Constitution takes effect, April 8, 1913
 The United States occupation of Veracruz, April 21, 1914 – November 23, 1914
 The Panama Canal opens to shipping, August 15, 1914
 The United States occupation of Haiti, July 28, 1915 – August 11, 1934
 Doroteo Arango Arámbula (Pancho Villa) orders raid on Columbus, New Mexico, March 9, 1916
 General John Pershing leads Mexican Expedition, March 14, 1916 – February 7, 1917
 The United States occupation of the Dominican Republic, May 16, 1916 – July 13, 1924
 The United States purchases the Danish West Indies from Denmark, January 17, 1917
 World War I, June 28, 1914 – November 11, 1918
 The United States declares war on the German Reich, April 6, 1917
 Armistice with Germany, November 11, 1918
 The Treaty of Versailles and the Covenant of the League of Nations are signed, June 28, 1919
 The United States Senate rejects the Treaty of Versailles primarily because of Article X of the Covenant of the League of Nations, March 20, 1920
 The United States Congress declares end of war, July 2, 1921
 Allied intervention in the Russian Civil War, May 26, 1918 – April 1, 1920
 The American Expeditionary Force Siberia, August 15, 1918 – April 1, 1920
 The American Expeditionary Force North Russia, September 4, 1918 – August 5, 1919
 The Eighteenth Amendment to the United States Constitution takes effect, January 29, 1919

1920s 
 The Nineteenth Amendment to the United States Constitution takes effect, August 18, 1920
 Warren G. Harding becomes the 29th President of the United States on March 4, 1921
 Calvin Coolidge becomes the 30th President of the United States upon the death of President Warren Harding on August 2, 1923
 Hurricane San Felipe Segundo strikes the Leeward Islands, Puerto Rico, the Bahamas, and Florida killing more than 4,000 people, September 6, 1928 – September 20, 1928
 Herbert Hoover becomes the 31st President of the United States on March 4, 1929
 Great Depression, September 3, 1929 – September 1, 1939
 Wall Street Crash, September 3, 1929 – July 8, 1932
 Black Tuesday, October 29, 1929

1930s 
 The Twentieth Amendment to the United States Constitution is ratified, January 23, 1933
 Franklin D. Roosevelt becomes the 32nd President of the United States on March 4, 1933
 The Eighteenth Amendment to the United States Constitution is repealed by the Twenty-first Amendment to the United States Constitution, December 5, 1933

1940s 
 The United States assumes the defense of Greenland (Kalaallit Nunaat), April 9, 1941 – 1946
 The United States assumes the defense of Iceland, July 27, 1941 – 1946
 The United States and Brazil assume the defense of Surinam, November 24, 1941 – 1946
 World War II, September 1, 1939 – September 2, 1945
 The Empire of Japan invades Manchuria, September 19, 1931
 The Italian Empire invades Ethiopia, October 3, 1935
 The German Reich invades Poland, September 1, 1939
 The Empire of Japan attacks Pearl Harbor, December 7, 1941
 The United States declares war on the Empire of Japan, December 8, 1941
 The German Reich declares war on the United States, December 11, 1941
 The United States declares war on the German Reich and the Italian Empire, December 11, 1941
 Aleutian Islands Campaign, June 3, 1942 – August 15, 1943
 The United States declares war on Bulgaria, Hungary, and Romania, June 5, 1942
 Allied Forces invade Sicily, July 9, 1943
 Allied Forces invade Italy, September 3, 1943
 Italy secretly signs an armistice with Allied Forces, September 3, 1943
 Allied Forces invade Normandy, June 6, 1944
 Japan launches Fu-Go balloon bombs into the northwestern United States, November 3, 1944 – April 15, 1945
 Allied Forces invade Okinawa, March 18, 1945
 German Instrument of Surrender signed May 7, 1945 and May 8, 1945
 The United States tests the first atomic bomb at the Trinity Site in New Mexico, July 16, 1945
 The United States drops an atomic bomb on Hiroshima, August 6, 1945
 The United States drops an atomic bomb on Nagasaki, August 9, 1945
 Japanese Instrument of Surrender signed September 2, 1945
 Harry S. Truman becomes the 33rd President of the United States upon the death of President Franklin Roosevelt on April 12, 1945
 The United States and 50 other nations form the United Nations, October 24, 1945
 The League of Nations ceases operation, April 20, 1946
 Cold War, March 5, 1946 – December 25, 1991
 Berlin Blockade, June 24, 1948 – May 11, 1949
 Berlin Airlift, June 25, 1948 – September 30, 1949

1950s 
 Korean War, June 25, 1950 – July 27, 1953
 North Korea invades South Korea, June 25, 1950
 The United Nations invade North Korea, September 15, 1950
 China invades North Korea, November 1, 1950
 China invades South Korea, January 1, 1951
 Korean Armistice Agreement signed July 27, 1953
 The Twenty-second Amendment to the United States Constitution takes effect, February 27, 1951
 Dwight D. Eisenhower becomes the 34th President of the United States on January 20, 1953
 The Territory of Alaska is admitted to the Union as the State of Alaska (the 49th state) on January 3, 1959
 Vietnam War, September 26, 1959 – April 30, 1975
 The United States sends military advisors to the Republic of Vietnam, February 12, 1955
 The United States and the Vietnam People's Army wage covert war in Laos, October 1962 – 1975
 The United States begins bombing the Democratic Republic of Vietnam, August 2, 1964
 The United States sends regular ground troops to the Republic of Vietnam, March 8, 1965
 Battle of Khe Sanh, January 21, 1968 – April 8, 1968
 Tet Offensive, January 30, 1968 – September 23, 1968
 Battle of Hue, January 30, 1968 – March 3, 1968
 The United States covertly bombs Vietnam People's Army military targets in Cambodia, 1968–1970
 Battle of Hamburger Hill, May 10, 1969 – May 20, 1969
 The United States and the Army of the Republic of Vietnam invade Cambodia, April 29, 1970 – July 22, 1970
 Paris Peace Accords, January 27, 1973
 The United States removes regular ground troops from the Republic of Vietnam, March 27, 1973
 Fall of Saigon, April 30, 1975
 The Territory of Hawaii is admitted to the Union as the State of Hawaiʻi (the 50th state) on August 21, 1959

1960s 
 Cuba confiscates property of United States companies and citizens, July 5, 1960
 John F. Kennedy becomes the 35th President of the United States on January 20, 1961
 The Twenty-third Amendment to the United States Constitution takes effect, March 29, 1961
 Cuban exiles supported by the United States invade Cuba, April 17, 1961 – April 19, 1961
 United States embargo against Cuba, since February 7, 1962
 Cuban Missile Crisis, October 15, 1962 – October 28, 1962
 United States naval quarantine of Cuba, October 24, 1962 – December 31, 1962
 Lyndon B. Johnson becomes the 36th President of the United States upon the assassination of President John Kennedy on November 22, 1963
 The Twenty-fourth Amendment to the United States Constitution takes effect, January 23, 1964
 A tremendous earthquake strikes the region around Anchorage, Alaska, on Good Friday, March 27, 1964
 The United States and allies invade the Dominican Republic, April 28, 1965 – September 1966
 The Twenty-fifth Amendment to the United States Constitution is ratified, February 10, 1967
 Richard Nixon becomes the 37th President of the United States on January 20, 1969
 Neil Armstrong and Buzz Aldrin are first people to walk on the Moon, July 20, 1969 – July 21, 1969

1970s 
 The Twenty-sixth Amendment to the United States Constitution takes effect, July 1, 1971
 Eugene Cernan and Harrison Schmitt are the last Apollo astronauts to walk on the Moon, December 11, 1972 – December 14, 1972
 The United States airlifts military supplies to Israel during the Yom Kippur War, October 12, 1973 – November 14, 1973
 Gerald Ford becomes the 38th President of the United States upon the resignation of President Richard Nixon on August 9, 1974
 The nation celebrates the Bicentennial of the United States of America, July 4, 1976
 Jimmy Carter becomes the 39th President of the United States on January 20, 1977
 Iran hostage crisis, November 4, 1979 – January 20, 1981
 The United States transfers sovereignty of the Panama Canal Zone back to the Republic of Panama, October 1, 1979

1980s 
 Mount St. Helens erupts, May 18, 1980
 Ronald Reagan becomes the 40th President of the United States on January 20, 1981
 The United States joins Multinational Force in Lebanon, August 29, 1982 – February 26, 1984
 Truck bombings kill 307 in Beirut, October 23, 1983
 The United States invades Grenada, October 25, 1983 – December 15, 1983
 The United States pursues the Strategic Defense Initiative, March 27, 1984 – May 13, 1993
 President Ronald Reagan presents Star Wars speech, March 23, 1983
 Black Monday, October 19, 1987
 Somali Civil War, since 1988
 The United Nations intervenes in the Somali Civil War, July 27, 1992 – March 3, 1995
 The United States leads the Unified Task Force, December 9, 1992 – May 4, 1993
 The United States deploys independent Task Force Ranger, August 8, 1993 – March 31, 1994
 Battle of Mogadishu, October 3, 1993 – October 4, 1993
 George H. W. Bush becomes the 41st President of the United States on January 20, 1989
 The United States invades Panama, December 20, 1989 – February 13, 1990

1990s 
 Persian Gulf War, August 2, 1990 – February 28, 1991
 The Republic of Iraq invades the State of Kuwait, August 2, 1990
 The United States and allies invade Kuwait and Iraq, February 24, 1991
 The United States and allies enforce a no-fly zone over Iraq north of the 36th parallel north, April 7, 1991 – December 31, 1996
 War in Bosnia and Herzegovina, April 1, 1992 – December 14, 1995
 The United Nations airlifts humanitarian aid to Bosnia and Hercegovina, July 2, 1992 – January 9, 1996
 NATO enforces ban on unauthorized military flights over Bosnia and Hercegovina, April 13, 1993 – August 30, 1995
 NATO bombs Bosnian Serb Army in Bosnia and Herzegovina, August 30, 1995 – September 20, 1995
 The Twenty-seventh Amendment to the United States Constitution takes effect, May 5, 1992
 The United States and allies enforce a no-fly zone over Iraq south of the 32nd parallel north, August 27, 1992 – September 4, 1996
 Bill Clinton becomes the 42nd President of the United States on January 20, 1993
 The United States contributes troops for United Nations peacekeeping in Macedonia, July 9, 1993 –
 The United States and allies invade Haiti, September 19, 1994 – March 31, 1995
 Dot-com bubble, January 4, 1995 – March 10, 2000
 Kosovo War, April 22, 1996 – June 11, 1999
 NATO bombs the Federal Republic of Yugoslavia, March 24, 1999 – June 10, 1999
 The United States and allies enforce an expanded no-fly zone over Iraq south of the 33rd parallel north, September 4, 1996 – April 30, 2003
 Al-Qaeda simultaneously bombs United States embassies in Dar es Salaam, Tanzania, and Nairobi, Kenya, August 7, 1998. The car bombs kill 223 people and injure more than 4000.
 The United States and the United Kingdom bomb Iraq, December 16, 1998 – December 19, 1998
 The United States House of Representatives impeaches President Bill Clinton, December 19, 1998
 The United States Senate acquits President Bill Clinton, February 12, 1999
 The United States transfers ownership of the Panama Canal to the Republic of Panama, December 31, 1999

21st century

2000s 
 Dot-com collapse on March 10, 2000 – October 10, 2002.
 United States housing bubble, 2000–2006.
 Al-Qaeda attack on the USS Cole at Aden in Yemen on October 12, 2000.
 George W. Bush becomes the 43rd President of the United States on January 20, 2001.
 Al-Qaeda attacks on the United States on September 11, 2001.
 Afghanistan War since October 7, 2001.
 The United States and allies invade Afghanistan on October 7, 2001.
 President George W. Bush declares Iran, Iraq, and North Korea to be the "Axis of Evil" on January 29, 2002.
 Iraq War since March 20, 2003.
 The United States and allies invade Iraq on March 20, 2003.
 Hurricane Katrina strikes Florida on August 25 and Louisiana and Mississippi on August 29, 2005. Subsequent failure of drainage canals floods 80% of New Orleans.
 United States housing collapse since 2006.
 Financial crisis of 2007–08.
 Barack Obama becomes the 44th President of the United States on January 20, 2009.
 Tea Party movement begins in 2009.

2010s 
 Libyan Rebellion since February 17, 2011.
 The United States and allies enforce no-fly zone over Libya beginning March 19, 2011.
 Osama bin Laden, the leader of al-Qaeda and the mastermind of the September 11 attacks, is killed in Pakistan by Navy SEALs.
 The Iraq War is declared formally over on December 15, 2011.
 Donald Trump becomes the 45th President of the United States on January 20, 2017.

2020s 
 The COVID-19 pandemic shuts down most businesses and activities, arriving on January 13, 2020.
 Joe Biden becomes the 46th President of the United States on January 20, 2021.
 The Afghanistan War ended with the remaining troops leaving the country on August 30, 2021.

By region 
 American Old West
 Confederate States of America
 History of New England
 History of the Southern United States
 History of the west coast of North America

States

 History of Alabama
 History of Alaska
 History of Arizona
 History of Arkansas
 History of California
 History of Colorado
 History of Connecticut
 History of Delaware
 History of Florida
 History of Georgia
 History of Hawaii
 History of Idaho
 History of Illinois
 History of Indiana
 History of Iowa
 History of Kansas
 History of Kentucky
 History of Louisiana
 History of Maine
 History of Maryland
 History of Massachusetts
 History of Michigan
 History of Minnesota
 History of Mississippi
 History of Missouri
 History of Montana
 History of Nebraska
 History of Nevada
 History of New Hampshire
 History of New Jersey
 History of New Mexico
 History of New York
 History of North Carolina
 History of North Dakota
 History of Ohio
 History of Oklahoma
 History of Oregon
 History of Pennsylvania
 History of Rhode Island
 History of South Carolina
 History of South Dakota
 History of Tennessee
 History of Texas
 History of Utah
 History of Vermont
 History of Virginia
 History of Washington
 History of West Virginia
 History of Wisconsin
 History of Wyoming

Federal district
 History of Washington, D.C.

Insular areas

 History of American Samoa
 History of Guam
 History of the Northern Mariana Islands
 History of Puerto Rico
 History of the U.S. Virgin Islands

Outlying islands

 History of Bajo Nuevo Bank
 History of Baker Island
 History of Howland Island
 History of Jarvis Island
 History of Johnston Atoll
 History of Kingman Reef
 History of Midway Atoll
 History of Navassa Island
 History of Palmyra Atoll
 History of Serranilla Bank
 History of Wake Island

By subject

History books 
Books on the history of the United States:
 A History of Money and Banking in the United States
 A Monetary History of the United States
 A Patriot's History of the United States
 A People's History of the United States
 African-American history of agriculture in the United States
 America: A Personal History of the United States
 Cyclopaedia of Political Science, Political Economy, and the Political History of the United States
 Land of Promise: An Economic History of the United States
 The History of the United States of America 1801–1817
 Oxford History of the United States
 The Penguin History of the United States of America
 Voices of a People's History of the United States

Cultural history of the United States 
 Cultural history of the United States
 History of immigration to the United States
 Music history of the United States
 Music history of the United States (1900–1940)
 Music history of the United States (1940s and 50s)
 Music history of the United States during the colonial era
 Music history of the United States in the 1960s
 Music history of the United States in the 1970s
 Music history of the United States in the 1980s
 Music history of the United States in the late 19th century
 Music history of the United States to the Civil War
 History of people in the United States
 African-American history
 History of Asian Americans
 Chinese American history
 Japanese American history
 Military history of Asian Americans
 History of disability rights in the United States
 Timeline of disability rights in the United States
 History of Hispanic and Latino Americans
 History of Mexican Americans
 History of the Jews in the United States
 History of antisemitism in the United States
 History of Jewish education in the United States before the 20th century
 History of LGBT people in the United States
 Bisexuality in the United States
 Gay men in American history
 History of lesbianism in the United States
 History of transgenderism in the United States
 History of violence against LGBT people in the United States
 History of Native Americans in the United States
 History of Philippine nurses in the United States
 History of the Poles in the United States
 History of women in the United States
 History of lesbianism in the United States
 Women's suffrage in the United States
 History of youth in the United States
 History of youth rights in the United States
 Timeline of young people's rights in the United States
 History of religion in the United States
 History of Christianity in the United States
 History of the Latter Day Saint movement
 History of Roman Catholicism in the United States
 History of the Catholic Church in the United States
 19th-century history of the Catholic Church in the United States
 20th-century history of the Catholic Church in the United States
 History of Protestantism in the United States
 History of the Episcopal Church (United States)
 History of Methodism in the United States
 History of sports in the United States
 History of baseball in the United States
 History of basketball
 History of United States cricket
 History of American football
 History of golf in the United States
 History of ice hockey in the United States
 History of the National Hockey League on United States television
 History of women's ice hockey in the United States
 United States at the Olympics
 History of rugby union in the United States
 History of rugby union matches between Canada and United States
 History of rugby union matches between Ireland and United States
 History of soccer in the United States
 History of the United States men's national soccer team
 History of professional wrestling in the United States
 History of time in the United States
 History of food in the United States
 History of the hamburger in the United States
 Architecture of the United States
 History of fountains in the United States

Economic history of the United States 
 Economic history of the United States
 History of banking in the United States
 History of central banking in the United States
 History of investment banking in the United States
 Industrial history of the United States
 History of agriculture in the United States
 History of commercial tobacco in the United States
 Early history of food regulation in the United States
 History of the lumber industry in the United States
 History of the United States Forest Service
 History of wildfire suppression in the United States
 History of energy in the United States
 History of coal mining in the United States
 History of the petroleum industry in the United States
 History of transport in the United States
 History of rail transport in the United States
 History of street lighting in the United States
 History of turnpikes and canals in the United States
 History of the trucking industry in the United States
 Labor history of the United States
 History of monetary policy in the United States
 History of the United States public debt
 History of United States debt ceiling
 History of United States–Middle East economic relations
 Numismatic history of the United States (currency)
 History of the United States dollar
 Recessions in the United States
 List of disasters in the United States by death toll
 List of natural disasters in the United States
 History of hotel fires in the United States

History of education in the United States 
 History of education in the United States
 History of education in the United States: Bibliography
 History of Catholic education in the United States
 History of deaf education in the United States

Geographic history of the United States 
 Demographic history of the United States
 Geologic history of the United States
 Territorial evolution of the United States

History of health care in the United States 
 History of medicine in the United States
 History of health care reform in the United States

Historiography of the United States 
 Historiography of the United States

Maritime history of the United States 
 Maritime history of the United States (1776–1799)
 Maritime history of the United States (1800–1899)
 Maritime history of the United States (1900–1999)
 Maritime history of the United States (2000–present)

Political history of the United States 
 Physical history of the United States Declaration of Independence
 History of the United States Constitution
 History of the United States Government
 Presidents of the United States
 George Washington: 1789–1797
 John Adams: 1797–1801
 Thomas Jefferson: 1801–1809
 James Madison: 1809–1817
 James Monroe: 1817–1825
 John Quincy Adams: 1825–1829
 Andrew Jackson: 1829–1837
 Martin Van Buren: 1837–1841
 William Henry Harrison: 1841
 John Tyler: 1841–1845
 James K. Polk: 1845–1849
 Zachary Taylor: 1849–1850
 Millard Fillmore: 1850–1853
 Franklin Pierce: 1853–1857
 James Buchanan: 1857–1861
 Abraham Lincoln: 1861–1865
 Andrew Johnson: 1865–1869
 Ulysses S. Grant: 1869–1877
 Rutherford B. Hayes: 1877–1881
 James A. Garfield: 1881
 Chester A. Arthur: 1881–1885
 Grover Cleveland: 1885–1889
 Benjamin Harrison: 1889–1893
 Grover Cleveland: 1893–1897
 William McKinley: 1897–1901
 Theodore Roosevelt: 1901–1909
 William H. Taft: 1909–1913
 Woodrow Wilson: 1913–1921
 Warren Harding: 1921–1923
 Calvin Coolidge: 1923–1929
 Herbert Hoover: 1929–1933
 Franklin D. Roosevelt: 1933–1945
 Harry S. Truman: 1945–1953
 Dwight D. Eisenhower: 1953–1961
 John F. Kennedy: 1961–1963
 Lyndon B. Johnson: 1963–1969
 Richard M. Nixon: 1969–1974
 Gerald Ford: 1974–1977
 Jimmy Carter: 1977–1981
 Ronald Reagan: 1981–1989
 George H. W. Bush: 1989–1993
 Bill Clinton: 1993–2001
 George W. Bush: 2001–2009
 Barack Obama: 2009–2017
 Donald Trump: 2017–2021
 Joe Biden: 2021–present
 History of the United States Congress
 History of the United States House of Representatives
 History of the United States Senate
 History of the Supreme Court of the United States
 History of the United States National Security Council
 Postage stamps and postal history of the United States
 History of United States postage rates
 History of the flags of the United States
 History of U.S. foreign policy
 Diplomatic history of the United States
 History of United States diplomatic relations by country
 United States treaties
 Labor history of the United States
 History of union busting in the United States
 History of cooperatives in the United States
 History of law in the United States
 History of United States antitrust law
 History of bankruptcy law in the United States
 History of civil rights in the United States
 Civil rights movement (1896–1954)
 Civil rights movement
 Timeline of civil marriage in the United States
 History of United States drug prohibition
 Legal history of cannabis in the United States
 History of laws concerning immigration and naturalization in the United States
 Legal history of income tax in the United States
 History of labor law in the United States
 History of United States patent law
 History of United States prison systems
 Military history of the United States
 List of United States military history events
 Conflicts in the United States
 List of wars involving the United States
 Military history of the United States during World War II
 History of the branches of the United States military
 History of the United States Air Force
 History of the United States Army
 History of the United States Army Special Forces
 History of the United States Coast Guard
 History of the United States Marine Corps
 History of the United States Navy
 History of United States Naval Operations in World War II (series)
 History of the United States Merchant Marine
 History of United States Navy ratings
 History of civil affairs in the United States Armed Forces
 History of the United States Military Academy
 History of military nutrition in the United States
 History of segregation in the United States Armed Forces
 Nuclear history of the United States
 History of United States political parties
 History of the United States Democratic Party
 History of the Green Party of the United States
 History of the Libertarian Party (United States)
 Electoral history of the Libertarian Party (United States)
 History of the United States Republican Party
 Electoral history of the Constitution Party (United States)
 History of lobbying in the United States
 Social class in American history
 History of Social Security in the United States
 History of the socialist movement in the United States
 History of direct democracy in the United States

History of science in the United States 
 History of paleontology in the United States

See also 
 Index of United States–related articles
 Library of Congress Classification:Class F -- Local History of the United States and British, Dutch, French, and Latin America
 List of presidents of the United States
 Outline of the United States
 Timeline of country and capital changes
 :Category:History of the United States
 commons:Category:History of the United States

References

Further reading 
 Adams, James Truslow, ed. Dictionary of American History (5 Vols. 1940)
 Kutler, Stanley I. ed. Dictionary of American History (3rd Edition 10 Volumes, 2003)
 Martin, Michael. Dictionary of American History (Littlefield, Adams 1989)
 Morris. Richard, ed. Encyclopedia of American History (7th ed. 1996)
 Purvis, Thomas L. A Dictionary of American History (Blackwell 1997)
 Schlesinger, Arthur M., Jr. The Almanac of American History ( 2nd ed. 1993)
 Thompson, Peter, and Chris Cook. Dictionary of American History: From 1763 to the Present (Facts on File, 2000)
 sinister 6 bomb Columbia 1789

External links 

History outline
outline
 
United States History
History of the United States by topic